St James's Church Hall is a church hall in Fortis Green Road, Muswell Hill, London, and a grade II listed building with Historic England. It was built in 1925 to a design by George Grey Wornum.

References

External links
 

Grade II listed buildings in the London Borough of Haringey
Muswell Hill
1925 establishments in England
Buildings and structures completed in 1925